This is a list of encyclopedias and encyclopedic/biographical dictionaries published on the subject of cuisine, cookery and chefs in any language. Entries are in the English language unless stated as otherwise.

Beer and brewing

See also 
 Bibliography of encyclopedias

Cuisine
Bibliographies of food and drink